Basketball in Africa is run by the FIBA Africa. The major competition that FIBA Africa runs for national teams is the AfroBasket, while its biggest tournament for sports clubs is the Basketball Africa League (BAL). The National Basketball Association (NBA) is investing millions to increase a foothold in the African market. Hakeem Olajuwon is considered to have been instrumental in developing and popularizing basketball in Africa.

History 
Introduced to Africa around the 1960s basketball has become a very popular sport. After more people took notice and practiced, professional teams were formed. The managers of the first African National Federation decide to participate and compete in FIBA, which is the world basketball governing body. Held on 30 and 31 August 1960 the FIBA Congress allowed the Egyptian Basketball Federation to set up an institution in order to compete. This led to the integration of twelve African countries to join FIBA and the world stage. These countries include Burkina Faso, Ethiopia, Egypt, Ghana, Guinea Conakry, Mali, Morocco, Libya, North Rhodesia, Sierra Leone, Sudan and Togo. Currently, FIBA Africa grew to a point where every single country in Africa has a designated team, leading to 54 active teams in the institution.

The activities of the youth program Basketball Without Borders in Africa, and program director Masai Ujiri, are profiled in Hubert Davis's 2016 documentary film Giants of Africa. Further youth developments have been done by FIBA and the NBA with the launch of the FIBA Africa Youth Camp in September 2021.

On February 18, 2019, FIBA and the NBA announced plans for a professional basketball league on the continent of Africa. The league was originally scheduled to start in January 2020, but the inaugural season was later scheduled for May 2021, when Zamalek SC were crowned the first ever champions of the Basketball Africa League (BAL).

Major influences

Hakeem Olajuwon 
One of the greatest African-born players to ever play the game of basketball, Hakeem Olajuwon was born in Lagos, Nigeria, and his skills were great enough for him to be noticed by U.S. NCAA college basketball teams. He was drafted into the NBA by the Houston Rockets and with them he won two NBA championships. He was voted the most valuable player of two NBA finals, and he is both a Basketball Hall of Fame player and FIBA Hall of Fame player. His career success helped to pave the way for many international players to compete in the NBA, and also inspired many scouts to look for new talent in other places in the world besides the U.S.

References